The 2021–22 Chennaiyin FC season is the club's eighth season since its establishment in 2014 as well as their eighth season in 2021–22 Indian Super League season.

Technical staff

Coaching Staff

Medical staff

Management Staff

Board of Directors

First-team squad

  denotes a player who is unavailable for rest of the season.

Contract Extensions

Transfer
  denotes a player who is signed in Winter Transfer. 
  denotes a player who is signed at End of season.

Transfer In

Transfer Out

In Blue:Winter Transfer

Pre-season and friendlies

Competition

Indian Super League

Summary

League table

Result summary

Results by round

Matches

Squad statistics

Statistics
2021-22 Indian Super League season Statistics

Goal scorers

Assists

Yellow cards

Red cards

References

Chennaiyin FC seasons
2021–22 Indian Super League season by team